Stuart Torevell (born 1 April 1974 in Stockport, Greater Manchester) is a camera operator and rigger working for television production company Antix Productions on shows such as Most Haunted. He is a cousin of Yvette Fielding.

Torevell is mostly known for his on-camera role as a paranormal investigator on Most Haunted and Most Haunted Live! He has been a member of the program since the show started in 2002.

He has alopecia, a condition that caused him to lose his hair. Torevell attributes his condition to a terrifying attack by a supernatural force at the Ancient Ram Inn. Torevell has also been trapped in a room in another location causing him extreme panic and fear.

References 

1974 births
Living people
People from Stockport
People with alopecia universalis